Steve Green (born 2 July 1976 in Kingston) is a Jamaican football player, who currently plays for Tivoli Gardens in the National Premier League.

Club career
He started playing football at Tivoli High School and made his debut for Tivoli Gardens in the 1992/1993 season. A one-club man, the speedy Green became one of the longest serving Premier League players on the eve of the 2010/2011 season, his 19th season at the top level. He is the only player to have won four league titles with Tivoli.

International career
Nicknamed Askel 45, Green made his senior debut for Jamaica in a February 1998 friendly match against Nigeria, coming on as a substitute for Dean Sewell. He was included in the Jamaican squad in the build-up to the 1998 FIFA World Cup but did not make the final squad. He has not represented his country in any FIFA World Cup qualification match but did play at the 2000 CONCACAF Gold Cup. He also made the squad for the 1999 Copa Caribe and played at the 1999 Panamerican Games.

His final international game was a May 2000 friendly match against Colombia.

Personal life
Green, as well as among others Tivoli Gardens teammate Owen Powell, was given a huge scare when detained by security forces during the Summer 2010 search for Christopher Coke in Tivoli Gardens community.

Honours
National Premier League: 4
 1999, 2004, 2009, 2011

References

External links
 

1976 births
Living people
Sportspeople from Kingston, Jamaica
Association football midfielders
Jamaican footballers
Jamaica international footballers
2000 CONCACAF Gold Cup players
Pan American Games competitors for Jamaica
Footballers at the 1999 Pan American Games
Tivoli Gardens F.C. players